David Austin French (born January 24, 1969) is an American  political commentator and former attorney who has argued high-profile religious liberty cases. He is a columnist for The New York Times. Formerly a fellow at the National Review Institute and a staff writer for National Review from 2015 to 2019, French currently serves as senior editor of The Dispatch and a contributing writer for The Atlantic.

Early life and education 
French was born in Opelika, Alabama. His parents were students at nearby Auburn University.

French graduated summa cum laude from Lipscomb University in 1991 with a Bachelor of Arts degree. He then went on to Harvard Law School where he graduated cum laude in 1994 with a Juris Doctor degree.

Career 
French has served as a senior counsel for the American Center for Law and Justice and the Alliance Defending Freedom, has lectured at Cornell Law School, and spent much of his career working on religious rights issues. He served as president of the Foundation for Individual Rights in Education (FIRE). French retired from FIRE in 2005, citing plans to serve in the United States Army Reserve as a judge-advocate general officer. He left the legal practice in 2015, and became a staff writer for National Review from 2015 to 2019, and a senior fellow at the National Review Institute,

French has authored several books, including the non-fiction Divided We Fall (2020).

French became a New York Times columnist in January 2023.

LGBT issues 
In August 2017, French was one of several co-authors of the so-called Nashville Statement, which affirmed "that it is sinful to approve of homosexual immorality or transgenderism and that such approval constitutes an essential departure from Christian faithfulness and witness." The statement was criticized by pro-LGBT Christians and LGBT campaigners, as well as by several conservative religious figures.

In November 2022, French announced that he had "changed his mind" on the legal recognition of same-sex marriage, although stating he was still morally opposed to the matter. He wrote that his "reasoning tracked my lifelong civil libertarian beliefs" and that: Millions of Americans have formed families and live their lives in deep reliance on Obergefell being good law. It would be profoundly disruptive and unjust to rip out the legal superstructure around which they’ve ordered their lives.

Military service 
French is a former major in the United States Army Reserve and a veteran of Operation Iraqi Freedom. French was deployed to Iraq in 2007 during the Iraq War, serving in Diyala Governorate as squadron judge-advocate. He was awarded a Bronze Star.

Potential 2016 U.S. presidential campaign 
French briefly considered entering the 2016 U.S. presidential race, citing his strong moral objections to U.S. Republican Party presumptive nominee Donald Trump. He ultimately decided that he had neither the name recognition nor the financial support to mount a viable campaign.

Attacks by the alt-right 
In 2016, French and his wife and family were the subject of online attacks when he criticized then-presidential candidate Donald Trump and the alt-right. French was bombarded with hateful tweets, including an image of his daughter in a gas chamber.

Dispute with Sohrab Ahmari 
A dispute between French and conservative New York Post editor Sohrab Ahmari broke out in the summer of 2019 as a result of the publication of Ahmari's polemical First Things article entitled "Against David French-ism." The dispute centered on their differing opinions on how conservatives should approach cultural and political debate and issues, with Ahmari arguing for a more ideologically firm approach against French's libertarian views.

Personal life 
French is an evangelical Christian. He is married to author Nancy French. French and his family live in Franklin, Tennessee. They have three children, including a daughter adopted from Ethiopia.

Bibliography 

 With Nancy French.
 With Jay Sekulow, Jordan Sekulow, and Robert Ash.

References

External links 

David French at National Review
David French at Ballotpedia

1969 births
Living people
20th-century Presbyterians
21st-century American writers
21st-century Presbyterians
Alliance Defending Freedom people
American columnists
American magazine editors
American political commentators
American male writers
American military lawyers
American Presbyterians
Cornell Law School faculty
Harvard Law School alumni
Lipscomb University alumni
National Review people
People from Columbia, Tennessee
People from Georgetown, Kentucky
United States Army officers
United States Army personnel of the Iraq War
United States Army reservists
Tennessee Independents
Tennessee Republicans